The 2015–16 Southern Jaguars basketball team represented Southern University during the 2015–16 NCAA Division I men's basketball season. The Jaguars, led by fifth year head coach Roman Banks, played their home games at the F. G. Clark Center and were members of the Southwestern Athletic Conference. They finished the season 22–13, 11–7 in SWAC play to finish in fourth place. They defeated Alabama State, Texas Southern, and Jackson State to be champions of the SWAC tournament. They earned the conference's automatic bid to the NCAA tournament where they lost in the First Four to Holy Cross.

Roster

Schedule 

|-
!colspan=9 style="background:#1560BD; color:#FFD700;"| Non-conference regular season

|-
!colspan=9 style="background:#1560BD; color:#FFD700;"| SWAC regular season
|-

|-
!colspan=9 style="background:#1560BD; color:#FFD700;"| SWAC tournament

|-
!colspan=9 style="background:#1560BD; color:#FFD700;"| NCAA tournament

References 

Southern Jaguars basketball seasons
Southern University
Southern
South
South